Aqa Mirlu (also Romanized as Āqā Mīrlū; also known as Agamiry, Āgha Mīri, and Āqā Mīrī) is a village in Minjavan-e Gharbi Rural District, Minjavan District, Khoda Afarin County, East Azerbaijan Province, Iran. At the 2006 census, its population was 35, in 9 families.

References 

Populated places in Khoda Afarin County